Elizabeth Benjamin (born c. 1972) is currently a managing director at Marathon Strategies, a communications and strategy firm in New York, and was a journalist with what was then Time Warner Cable News (TWCN), serving as the editor-in-chief of "State of Politics," a blog covering the politics of the state of New York, and as the host of the daily political news and interview show Capital Tonight. She was employed with TWCN's predecessor YNN and NY1, starting in 2011. Prior to this, she wrote a column for the New York Daily News, also covering state and city politics. Before her position at the News, she reported for the Albany Times-Union and blogged under its Capitol Confidential blog.
 
Benjamin currently appears as a political pundit on radio shows such as WNYC's the Brian Lehrer Show and on TV shows on channels such as CUNY-TV and NY1; in addition to her regular blog for TWCN, she also serves as a semi-regular columnist for the online publication Capital New York.

In 2013, she married Steven Smith, spokesman for the Albany police department. The two had met at a news conference earlier that year. Smith, then training for his first-ever triathlon, was directed towards Benjamin, a past Ironman participant who has a tattoo from that event on her leg. They began training together and eventually dating. New York's chief judge, Jonathan Lippman, officiated at the ceremony, held in Poughkeepsie.

Awards
 2009 Hal Hovey Award

References

1970s births
Living people
American female triathletes
American women television journalists
Columbia University Graduate School of Journalism alumni
University of Rochester alumni
21st-century American journalists
21st-century American women